Omotayo Ogedengbe (born 12 May 1987) is a British professional basketball player who currently plays for the Surrey Scorchers in the British Basketball League.

Early life 
Ogedenbge began playing basketball aged 17 for local team the Ealing Tornados. After winning the Under-18 conference, he was selected to play for the England U18 national team.

College career 
After his performances for Ealing Tornados, he was rewarded with a half-scholarship to Temple University in Philadelphia, but returned after three months to debut for the London Towers.

Professional career 
In 2007, Ogedenge joined British Basketball League team London Capital and averaged 7.3 points per game in his debut season. He then moved to Spain for a year to join the Grand Canaries Basketball Academy.

Ogedenge returned to England in 2009, and made 117 appearances over three seasons with the Guildford Heat. He later joined the London Lions for the 2012–13 season.

In 2013, he joined French team Calais Basket Cheminots and was selected for French National All-Star game. Upon returning to England once again, Ogedenge joined the Glasgow Rocks for a single season and averaged 15.3 points per game.

A year later, he became the first ever signing for the Surrey Scorchers. He was later named captain and has become the franchise's longest serving player.

References 

1987 births
Living people
British Basketball League players
British expatriate basketball people in France
British expatriate basketball people in Spain
British expatriate basketball people in the United States
British men's basketball players
Forwards (basketball)
Glasgow Rocks players
Guards (basketball)
Surrey Scorchers players
Temple Owls men's basketball players